Koregaon railway station is a small railway station serving Koregaon town in Satara district of Maharashtra State of India. It is under Pune railway division of Central Railway zone of Indian Railways. Its code is KRG. The station consists of one platform. The platform is not well sheltered. It lacks many facilities including water and sanitation.

Trains 
 Koyna Express
 Maharashtra Express
 Sahyadri Express
 CSMT Kolhapur–Satara Passenger
 CSMT Kolhapur–Pune Passenger

References

Pune railway division
Railway stations in Satara district